(DIN; in English, the German Institute for Standardisation Registered Association) is the German national organization for standardization and is the German ISO member body. DIN is a German Registered Association (e.V.) headquartered in Berlin. There are currently around thirty thousand DIN Standards, covering nearly every field of technology.

History 

This is largely due to the historic origin of the DIN as "NADI". For example, the first published standard was '' (about tapered pins) in 1918. Many people still mistakenly associate DIN with the old  naming convention.

One of the earliest, and probably the best known, is DIN 476 — the standard that introduced the A-series paper sizes in 1922 — adopted in 1975 as International Standard ISO 216. Common examples in modern technology include DIN and mini-DIN connectors for electronics, and the DIN rail.

DIN SPEC 3105, published in 2020, is "the first German standard to be published under an open license (CC-BY-SA 4.0) [...] to implement an open standardisation process".

DIN standard designation
The designation of a DIN standard shows its origin (# denotes a number):
 DIN # is used for German standards with primarily domestic significance or designed as a first step toward international status. E DIN # is a draft standard and DIN V # is a preliminary standard.
DIN EN # is used for the German edition of European standards.
DIN ISO # is used for the German edition of ISO standards.
DIN EN ISO # is used if the standard has also been adopted as a European standard.

Examples of DIN standards

 DIN 476: international paper sizes (now ISO 216 or DIN EN ISO 216)
 DIN 1451: typeface used by German railways and on traffic signs
 DIN 31635: transliteration of the Arabic language
 DIN 41612: mechanical standard for backplane electrical connection
 DIN 72552: electric terminal numbers in automobiles

See also
Austrian Standards International
Swiss Association for Standardization
Die Brücke, an earlier German institute aiming to set standard paper sizes
DIN film speed
DIN connector
Scuba: DIN connection, DIN connectors
 DQS - Deutsche Gesellschaft zur Zertifizierung von Managementsystemen, a subsidiary of DIN
DGQ - Deutsche Gesellschaft für Qualität, founded DQS in 1985 together with DIN

External links 
DIN home page (German version)
DIN home page (English version)
Guidance paper (in German)
Further education (in German)
Web Courses (official education partner) (in German)
Safety instructions (official DIN education partner) (in German)
Training for engineers, managers and experts (official education partner) (in German)
International Organization for Standardization (ISO)

 
ISO member bodies
Organizations established in 1917
1917 establishments in Germany